Sarai Kale Khan Inter-State Bus Terminus (ISBT) is a major bus terminus complex in Delhi, India catering to bus services to Haryana and Rajasthan states.

Built to decongest the over-crowded Kashmere Gate ISBT, which was unable to bear the increase in inter-State traffic, construction of Rs. 80-crore terminus complex began in March 1996, and it was commissioned in January 2005 though it was subsequently redeveloped to handle the increased volume of passengers. Further it is aimed to integrate with the Delhi Metro Rail link coming up near Pragati Maidan and also inter-connect the bus terminus with Nizamuddin Railway Station to cater to the rising volume of passenger traffic.

Passengers should take care of pick pocketers here specially during night. Gangs are active to steal your mobiles and no CCTV surveillance is available

Connections
It is adjacent to the Hazrat Nizamuddin Railway Station. Sarai Kale Khan is the terminus for most buses heading for towns south of Delhi. It is also a DTC bus depot for the Mudrika Seva (Ring Road Bus Service) and many other bus routes.

Also in the vicinity is an Elevated road project that connects Sarai Kale Khan with Jawaharlal Nehru Stadium on Lodhi Road, this would subsequently be extended to Mayur Vihar in East Delhi from Sarai Kale Khan side and to INA Colony from the stadium end, during the phase II of the construction.

See also

 Delhi
 Transport in Delhi
 Maharana Pratap Inter State Bus Terminus
 Sarai Kale Khan - Nizamuddin metro station
 Inter State Bus Terminals
 Swami Vivekanand Inter State Bus Terminus

References

External links

 Sarai Kale Khan at wikimapia
 What’s in a name?  (History behind the name) at The Hindu

Bus stations in India
Transport in Delhi